Dennis Jastrzembski (born 20 February 2000) is a professional footballer who plays as a winger for Ekstraklasa club Śląsk Wrocław. Born in Germany, he has represented both Germany and Poland at youth level.

Club career

Hertha
Jastrzembski made his professional debut for Hertha BSC on 20 August 2018, appearing in the first round of the 2018–19 DFB-Pokal against 3. Liga side Eintracht Braunschweig. He was substituted on in the 75th minute for Salomon Kalou, and assisted the winning goal by Vedad Ibišević in the 83rd minute, with the match finishing as a 2–1 away win for Hertha.

Loans
On 31 January 2020, SC Paderborn 07 announced the signing of Jastrzembski on a loan deal lasting until 2021.

On 27 January 2021, Jastrzembski moved to German club SV Waldhof Mannheim on a loan deal until the end of the season.

Śląsk Wrocław
On 25 January 2022, Jastrzembski moved to the country he most recently represented, Poland, signing a three-and-a-half-year deal with Ekstraklasa side Śląsk Wrocław.

International career
Jastrzembski was capped for Poland's under-15 team in 2015, where he appeared made four appearances and scored one goal. Later that year, he was capped four times for the Poland national under-16, scoring one goal.

In 2016, Jastrzembski switched to Germany, first appearing in the under-16 team. In 2017, he was included in Germany's squad for the 2017 UEFA European Under-17 Championship in Croatia, where Germany were eliminated in the semi-finals. Later that year, he was included in Germany's squad for the 2017 FIFA U-17 World Cup in India, where Germany were eliminated in the quarter-finals.

In 2020, he switched back to Poland and was called up to the under-20 team in March that year. He made his first appearance for Poland U21 off the bench in a 2021 UEFA European Under-21 Championship qualifier against Serbia U21 on 9 October 2020.

Personal life
Jastrzembski was born in Rendsburg, Schleswig-Holstein and is of Polish descent. His brother Chris is also a footballer.

References

External links
 Profile at DFB.de
 Profile at kicker.de
 
 
 

2000 births
Living people
People from Rendsburg
Footballers from Schleswig-Holstein
German footballers
Polish footballers
Association football wingers
Germany youth international footballers
Poland youth international footballers
Poland under-21 international footballers
German people of Polish descent
Polish people of German descent
Citizens of Poland through descent
Bundesliga players
2. Bundesliga players
3. Liga players
Ekstraklasa players
Hertha BSC players
Hertha BSC II players
SC Paderborn 07 players
SV Waldhof Mannheim players
Śląsk Wrocław players